is the theatrical superhero film adaptation of the Japanese 2004 Kamen Rider series, Kamen Rider Blade, directed by Hidenori Ishida and Katsuya Watanabe and written by Toshiki Inoue.

The film is produced by Ishimori Productions and Toei, the producers of all the previous television series and films of the Kamen Rider series. Following the tradition of all Heisei Kamen Rider movies, it is a double bill with the movie for 2004's Super Sentai series Tokusou Sentai Dekaranger, Tokusou Sentai Dekaranger The Movie: Full Blast Action, both of which premiered on September 11, 2004. The film's title is translated into English as Masked Rider Blade The Movie: Missing Ace.

The Director's Cut was released on DVD on May 21, 2005 and peaked at number 13 in the weekly Oricon chart, remaining in the list for 5 weeks. A Blu-Ray reissue of the movie was released on June 13, 2010.

Plot 

Four years after an alternate ending to the series, in which Blade seals the Joker, the characters have moved on with their lives: Kenzaki is a garbage man which in comparison to the chaos he went through was a huge change of pace, Mutsuki has graduated high school, and Kotarō has published a book about the Kamen Riders to great success, but on Amane's upcoming birthday, it was revealed that she has become a delinquent without the emotional support of Hajime. The Undead have been re-released, and a new trio of Kamen Riders—Glaive, Larc and Lance—have emerged from BOARD, now led by Tachibana. After recapturing two of the Category Aces, Kenzaki and Mutsuki join with the new Riders. When all the Undead are sealed once more, Glaive reveals himself to be the Albino Joker, a white version of the original Joker, and captures Kotarō's niece to obtain the ultimate power, sealing her in the Vanity Card. In order to free Amane from the card, Hajime is unsealed from the Joker Card and the four Riders are again united, intent on saving Amane and stopping the Albino Joker. In the end, Hajime swaps his life for Amane in the Vanity Card and allows himself to be destroyed by Blade to weaken Jashin 14. Blade uses his King Form to cut Jashin 14 in half, putting an end to the Undead.

Cast 
 : 
 : 
 :  (Played as "Hironari Amano")
 : 
 : 
 : 
 : 
 : 
 : 
 : 
 : 
 : 
 : 
 : 
 : 
 : 
 Rider Chips
 : 
 : 
 : 
 Rouzer Voice: 
 King Rouzer Voice:

Songs 
Theme song
"ELEMENTS"
Lyrics: Shoko Fujibayashi
Composition: Miki Fujisue
Composition: Rider Chips, Cher Watanabe
Artist: Rider Chips featuring Ricky
After his performance in "ELEMENTS," Ricky was made Rider Chips' permanent vocalist.

References

External links 
 Cinema Online review 

2004 films
Blade
Kamen Rider Blade